Ryuki may refer to:

Ryūki, a masculine Japanese given name
Ingen Ryuki (1592–1673), a Chinese Buddhist monk
Gairyuki, one of the Zoids
Kamen Rider Ryuki, a tokusatsu television series that ran from 2002 to 2003
Kamen Rider Ryuki, its title character